Ruth Dodsworth (born 21 May 1975) is a British broadcaster, journalist and weather presenter, best known for her work at ITV Cymru Wales.

Career
Dodsworth began her career in radio, working as a researcher for BBC Radio Wales in the mid 1990s.

She joined ITV Cymru Wales (previously HTV Wales) in June 1996, training as a news reporter and presenter. She switched roles to become a weather presenter in 2000.

She has also presented a wide range of local programmes for ITV Cymru Wales, including The Ferret, Grassroots, coverage of the Royal Welsh Show and the Llangollen International Eisteddfod, Wales This Week, A Little Piece of Paradise and the BAFTA-nominated Coast and Country.

Dodsworth is also a relief weather presenter for ITV's English regions, including London and Central.

In September 2015, Dodsworth joined regional radio station Nation Radio as co-presenter of the station's breakfast show, The Big Welsh Wake Up, alongside Niall Foster.

In November 2016, she began co-presenting a weekday breakfast show for Nation's five local radio stations in south and west Wales – Radio Pembrokeshire, Radio Carmarthenshire, Radio Ceredigion, Swansea Bay Radio and 106.3 Bridge FM. Dodsworth left Nation the following year.

On 5 May 2022, Dodsworth presented the factual documentary Controlled By My Partner? The Hidden Abuse on ITV1.

On 1 December 2022, Dodsworth made her debut as a guest weather presenter for Good Morning Britain on ITV Breakfast.

Personal life
Born in Worthing, West Sussex, Dodsworth graduated from university with a degree in communications, before studying postgraduate journalism at Cardiff University through an ITV-sponsored course.

In August 2002, she married businessman Jonathan Wignall, who ran the Escape nightclub in Swansea and an annual dance music festival in the city. They met at the 'Escape into the Park' festival during filming of Dodsworth's HTV Wales series, The Night Before the Morning After, in 2001. Following a miscarriage, the couple had two children before moving from Swansea to Cowbridge in the Vale of Glamorgan in 2010.

Dodsworth left Wignall in October 2019, after he called her over 150 times in a single day, and threatened to take his own life. The following day, he was arrested on suspicion of harassment. Following his arrest, it later emerged Wignall had planted a tracker device on Dodsworth's car, linked to an app and a laptop computer.

In March 2021, Wignall admitted a charge of coercive and controlling behaviour and stalking against Dodsworth over a nine-year period. Cardiff Crown Court heard Dodsworth had been left "frightened and broken" by his "verbally abusive and physically violent" behaviour. On one occasion, she was pushed by Wignall in front of family members, causing a fractured rib.

He was jailed for three years and given a restraining order against contacting Dodsworth.

Charity work
Dodsworth is an ambassador for Cancer Research Wales and the Tŷ Hafan children's hospice in the Vale of Glamorgan.

She also took part in a charity trek across the Sahara desert in early 2016 and a trek along the Laugavegur trail in Iceland in September 2019.

References

External links
Your Wales Weather Team, ITV Cymru Wales at itv.com

Living people
1975 births
English television presenters
ITV Weather
People from Worthing
People from Cowbridge